Semir Ben-Amor (born May 6, 1982) is a Finnish former professional ice hockey player who last played for Ässät of the SM-liiga.

Ben-Amor was born and raised in Espoo Tapiola.

Ben-Amor was a key player in the 2012 notorious practice game between HIFK and Jokerit, where multiple long suspensions were given for violent and unsportsmanlike behavior to players as well as coaches from both teams. Ben-Amor was given the longest suspension of 18 games for checking Ville Peltonen from a blind spot in the middle of the ice, and then beating him while he was down and rendering him unconscious. Reportedly, someone from Jokerit's command told Ben-Amor to take him down, and the league gave the head and assisting coach both a suspension of eight games with clear signs of encouraging players to break the rules. Ben-Amor denies this, saying it was his own decision, but he regrets how it ultimately happened. In December 2012, he was fined €3,540 for assault. His 18-game suspension remains the third longest in the league's history, behind Ari Lähteenmäki's 27-game suspension in 1986 for cross-checking and violence, and Jere Karalahti's 22-game suspension in 1997 for the use of drugs.

Career statistics

References

External links

1982 births
Living people
Finnish ice hockey forwards
Finnish people of Tunisian descent
Ässät players
Danbury Trashers players
Espoo Blues players
Jokerit players
Louisiana IceGators (ECHL) players
Lukko players
HC Salamat players
Richmond RiverDogs players
Ice hockey people from Helsinki